Ward 8 Eglinton—Lawrence is a municipal electoral division in North York, Toronto, Ontario that has been represented in the Toronto City Council since the 2018 municipal election. It was last contested in 2018, with Mike Colle elected councillor for the 2018–2022 term.

History 
The ward was created in 2018 when the provincial government aligned Toronto's then-44 municipal wards with the 25 corresponding provincial and federal ridings. The current ward is an amalgamation of the old Ward 15 (western section), the old Ward 16 (eastern section).

2018 municipal election 
Eglinton—Lawrence was first contested during the 2018 municipal election with 10 candidates. Notably, former Metro councillor Mike Colle, who sat in the Legislative Assembly of Ontario and is the father of then-Ward 15 councillor Josh Colle ran against  Christin Carmichael Greb, who was the then-Ward 16 incumbent. Colle was ultimately elected with 41.34 per cent of the vote.

Geography 
Ward 8 is part of the North York community council.

Eglinton—Lawrence's west boundary are the railway tracks where GO Transit's Barrie line runs and the east boundary is Yonge Street. The north boundary is Highway 401 and the south boundary is Eglinton Avenue.

Councillors

Election results

See also 

 Municipal elections in Canada
 Municipal government of Toronto
 List of Toronto municipal elections

References

External links 

 Councillor's webpage

Toronto city council wards
North York
2018 establishments in Ontario